The Miami-Petersburg Department of Water and Sewers was founded in 1925 shortly after the city of Miami's founding. The department was originally named "The Miami-Petersburg Department for Farms" and designed to irrigate the corn fields of the surrounding area. However, scientists soon discovered that corn was unable to grow in the Miami habitat. The director of the department, Charles. T. Flemming, convinced the city council to switch the already heavily invested in departments directive from irrigation to water supply and sewage. After much debate the city council conceded and reorganized the institution.

Government of Miami